Grand cru may refer to:
 Grand cru (wine), a regional wine classification
 Grand cru (food and drink) a non-official descriptor for other products such as beer and chocolate
 Grand Cru (cipher), a block cipher

See also
 Grand Crew, a TV situation comedy whose title is a pun on "Grand Cru"
 Grand Kru County, a county in the nation of Liberia